"Someone Else's Star" is a song written by Skip Ewing and Jim Weatherly, and recorded by American country music singer Bryan White. It was released in May 1995 as the third single from his self-titled debut album. The song was White's first Number One on the Billboard Hot Country Singles & Tracks (now Hot Country Songs) chart.

Content
The song's narrator is a male character who laments his inability to find someone with whom he can fall in love. He then assumes that others are getting what he is wishing for because he is "wishing on someone else's star".

Chart performance
White's version of the song debuted at number 60 on the Hot Country Songs chart dated May 27, 1995. It charted for twenty weeks on that chart, and reached Number One on the chart dated September 9, 1995, where it remained for one week, also giving White his first Number One single.

Charts

Year-end charts

References

1994 songs
Davis Daniel songs
Bryan White songs
1995 singles
Songs written by Skip Ewing
Songs written by Jim Weatherly
Song recordings produced by Billy Joe Walker Jr.
Song recordings produced by Kyle Lehning
Asylum Records singles
Music videos directed by John Lloyd Miller